Su Po-tai (born 2 June 1941) is a Taiwanese hurdler. He competed in the men's 110 metres hurdles at the 1968 Summer Olympics.

References

1941 births
Living people
Athletes (track and field) at the 1968 Summer Olympics
Taiwanese male hurdlers
Olympic athletes of Taiwan
Place of birth missing (living people)